Trifa is a Romanian surname. Notable people with the surname include:

 Iosif Trifa (1888–1938), Romanian Orthodox priest and evangelist
 Valerian Trifa (1914–1987), Romanian Orthodox cleric and fascist political activist
 Vlad Trifa, computer scientist

Romanian-language surnames